John Alfred Morrison (26 March 1911 – 1984) was a professional footballer who played for Bostall Heath, Callender's Athletic, Tottenham Hotspur and Northfleet United.

Football career 
Morrison began his career at non–league Bostall Heath before being given a trial at Luton Town in 1929. After playing for Kent side Callenders Athletic he joined the Spurs in 1931 for his first spell at the club. He moved to the Tottenham Hotspur nursery club Northfleet United before rejoining the White Hart Lane side in 1932. The free-scoring centre forward played a total of 154 matches and found the net on 102 occasions in all competitions up to the outbreak of the Second World War in 1939. , Morrison is one of only seventeen players to score one hundred goals for the Lilywhites.

References
 

1911 births
1984 deaths
Footballers from Belvedere, London
English footballers
Bostall Heath F.C. players
Callender's Athletic F.C. players
Tottenham Hotspur F.C. players
Northfleet United F.C. players
English Football League players
Association football forwards